The Jagiellonian compromise is an electoral system for two-tier voting bodies originally proposed in 2004 for the Council of the European Union as a way of achieving "one person, one vote" within the union. The compromise was analysed by various authors and received attention in the popular press. The system is based on the square root law of Penrose, which implies that a priori voting power defined by the Penrose–Banzhaf index of a member of a voting body is inversely proportional to the square root of its size. Hence the number of votes obtained by a representative of a state   with population 
Jagiellonian Compromise is based on a single criterion only. Decision of the Council of the union of  member states is taken if the sum of the weights of states voting in favour of a given proposal exceeds the qualified majority quota    equal to 


See also 

 List of countries and dependencies by population
 Penrose method

References

Footnotes

Bibliography 

 
 
 
 
 

Electoral systems
European Union
Political compromises in Europe